Hülya Vurnal İkizgül (born 1967 in Istanbul, Turkey), is a Turkish mosaicist, sculptor and ceramic artist.

Following her graduation from the Faculty of Arts at the Marmara University in 1990, she made her master's degree in the same faculty. She worked in the Workshop of Mural under the direction of renowned painter Mustafa Pilevneli. She prepared her thesis on artists Eren Eyüboğlu and Bedri Rahmi Eyüboğlu, titled The Art of Mosaic and the Mosaics of Bedri Rahmi - Eren Eyüboğlu.

According to critics: Between her fingers, the least stone becomes magic, and when she assembles of it hundred various size and color, she gives rise to splendid polychrome mosaics. With her panels represented accompanied by poetries and music composed by the author Hülya Vurnal İkizgül is an artist, who also expresses herself in the field musical and poetic, and which then makes a success of a made total work of echoes and correspondences, in order to better await an ideal condensed in this formula: "to live as at the interior of a dream".

From 13 to October 29, 1992, she opened an "Exposition of Paintings and Sculptures Mosaic" in a historical site, the Museum of Hagia Sophia (Ayasofya Museum) in Istanbul.

From 1 to October 31, 1994, as an invited artist representing of the modern art of mosaic, she exposed her "Mosaic Paintings and Sculptures" at the Museum of Archaeology of Istres in Marseilles, France. Among ten prestigious exposures, it is noteworthy to also name that one of the "Paintings and Mosaic Sculptures" decorated the historical Darphane-i Amire (Imperial Mint) in Istanbul between October 16 and November 3, 2002.

Inter alia, she has three works at the Museum of Archaeology of Istres, in Marseilles.

References

External links
 Personal website 

1966 births
Living people
Artists from Istanbul
Turkish ceramists
Mosaic artists
Marmara University alumni
Turkish women sculptors
20th-century Turkish sculptors
21st-century Turkish sculptors
20th-century Turkish women artists
21st-century Turkish women artists
21st-century ceramists
Turkish women ceramists